The 2010 Portimão Superbike World Championship round was the second round of the 2010 Superbike World Championship. It took place on the weekend of March 26–28, 2010 at the Autódromo Internacional do Algarve.

Results

Superbike race 1 classification

Superbike race 2 classification

Supersport race classification

External links
 The official website of the Superbike World Championship

Portimao Round
Portimao Superbike